The Land Rover Aqaba Assembly Plant Co., Ltd. is a joint venture between the Land Rover brand, the Shahin Group and Ole Automotive. It was founded on 18 February 2001, and is located in the Aqaba Special Economic Zone of Aqaba in Jordan.  There was a capital of 70 million dinar injected to build this plant. About 1,000 workers are employed there, assembling 5,000 units annually.

Model currently in production

Models formerly in production

External links 
 

Aqaba Assembly
Motor vehicle manufacturers of Jordan
Aqaba
Vehicle manufacturing companies established in 2001